Amalfi is town and municipality of the Colombian Andes, northern part of the Central Mountain Range in the Antioquia Department and part of the subregion of Northeastern Antioquia. The territory of Amalfi is bordered by the municipalities of Anorí and Segovia at its north; Segovia, Remedios and Vegachí at the east; Vegachí, Yalí, Yolombó and Gómez Plata at the south and Anorí and Guadalupe at the west. The town is served by Amalfi Airport.

It has an extension of 91 miles squares, being one of the biggest Antioquean municipalities in extension with a population of 22,088 inhabitants. The county seat has a population of 11,481 inhabitants and it is located in La Víbora Valley, on a mountainous region that is rich in gold and water reserves, attracting settlers since the half of the 19th century from other Antioquean regions, especially Copacabana, Rionegro, La Ceja, Santa Fe de Antioquia, Yarumal and Santa Rosa de Osos, as well as migrants from countries such as Spain, Syria, Liban, Morocco, China, Germany, Sweden, Finland and West African regions like Nigeria. A permanent affluent of outside settlers during the 19th and 20th centuries searching for gold, absorbed the native population from whom there are archeological evidences dated about 9 thousand years ago that belong to the cultures of the Yamesíes, Guamocoes and Tahamíes. Their extinct language is alive in local expressions and geographical names in their interaction with European and African descendants.

The municipality is identified with the Tiger of Amafil, a historical event dated 1949, when some locals hunted a Bengal Tiger that was freed in the region. As it is also the natural habitat of the jaguar, the event became popular. The inhabitants are known as the Tigers of Amalfi.

Toponymy 

The name Amalfi in Colombia honors the Italian city of Amalfi of Salerno, which name has two hypothesis:

 Derivation from the name Melfi, a commune of the Vulture area in the Province of Potenza, southern Italy, at the foot of the Vulture Mountain. Today, Melfi is a commercial and touristic area.
 A Roman gens of the 1st century that was a family consisting of all those individuals who shared the same nomen and claimed descent from a common ancestor in ancient Rome. The Roman gens of Amalfi created this town at the Adriatic coast in 596.

History

Pre-Columbian time 

The position of Amalfi between the last edges of the Andes to its north and the slopes to the Caribbean region, made it a human corridor of ancient migrations. Native Americans were present in what is today modern Colombia since about 15 thousand years ago. In the region of the municipality of Amalfi there are archeological traces dated 9 thousand years ago related to the cultures of Yamesíes, Guamocoes and Tahamíes. Although those peoples are considered today extinct, their descendants survived in the mestizo population of the region, as well as ancient traditions, names, believes and myths like the Jaguar cult, the petroglyphs, words and other elements that are object of current anthropological and archaeological studies.

Land of pioneers 

The territory of the modern municipality of Amalfi was not of much interest for the Spaniards during the three centuries of colonial rule (16th to 18th centuries) as it was in neighbouring regions such as Segovia, Remedios and Yolombó, attracted by their rich gold mines.

In 1580 the Spaniard conqueror of Antioquia, Don Gaspar de Rodas, made an excursion to the region following the Porce and Nechi rivers, but he did not make Spanish foundations. He would established the town of Zaragoza in 1581, while searching for a connection with the Magdalena River.

During the 18th century groups of traders from Cartagena de Indias, Santa Marta and Mompox settled on the Lower Cauca of Antioquia searching for gold and founded the first town in the today Amalfi territory known as Cancán that is today known as Corregimiento de Portachuelo. They built a Catholic church and some persons lived there, depending their administration from Zaragoza, but it was abandoned few years later.

After the Independence of Antioquia, General Julián Trujillo, acting governor, tried to recover the old foundation under the name of San Martín town, but it did not attract enough settlers and was abandoned in 1888.

During the Antioquean Colonization, families from Rionegro, La Ceja and other towns of the Eastern Antioquia, Medellín, Copacabana, Yarumal, Santa Rosa de Osos and Santa Fe de Antioquia, migrated to the region in search of gold and other opportunities. Among these first Antioquean settlers, came also foreigners, especially German Jews, Arabs from the Middle East, Chinese that were working on the Antioquean Rail Constructions and Nordic Europeans (Norway.)

Official foundation 

In 1838 Reverend Father José Santamaría y Zola, a Spaniard Catholic priest from Málaga, Spain that was living in Copacabana, led an expedition of families that were looking for new opportunities around the mine golds. They founded a town at the Riachón River Valley that was concluded in 1843. The first settlers changed the name many times: Riachón, Santa Bárbara, Cueva Santa and Nueva Población.

Bishop Juan de la Cruz Gómez Plata made a visit to Italy and he got in love with the Italian town of Amalfi of Salerno. Although it was a town at the side of the Tyrrhenian Sea, very different from the mountain town on the Antioquia's Andes, Bishop Gómez Plata thought that the blue skies of the Italian town resembled that of the Antioquean one. For this reason he decided to give that Italian name to the new settlement of gold miners to be called Amalfi-Antioquia.

A Swedish migrant into the region, engineer and geographer, Carlos Segismundo de Greiff (1793-1870), made his contribution with the design of the streets of the new town with professor Antonio Aguilar, a master plan that is preserved and admired for its symmetric distribution on the Riachón Valley. This Swedish Greiff is the first ancestor in Colombia of the Greiff family that generated remarkable characters such as poet León de Greiff (1895–1976), musician and journalist Otto de Greiff (1903-1995), politician Gustavo de Greiff Restrepo (1929-), lawyer Mónica de Greiff (1956-) and historian Jorge Arias de Greiff (1922-).

References 

Municipalities of Antioquia Department